Howard Harrison Cooksey (1921-1999) was a United States Army Lieutenant General who served as deputy commander of the 23rd Infantry Division during the Vietnam War.

Early life and education
Cooksey was born in Brentsville, Virginia and grew up in Manassas. He attended Virginia Tech, graduating in 1943.

Military service

World War II
He served with the 158th Regimental Combat Team.

Korean War
He served in the 7th Infantry Division.

Post Korean War
In 1961, he served with 2nd Battle Group, 6th Infantry Regiment, part of the Berlin Brigade.

In 1964, he obtained a Master's Degree in Foreign Affairs from George Washington University.

In 1968, he was the commanding officer of Fort Dix before receiving orders to locate to South Vietnam in June 1968.

Vietnam War
He served as deputy commander of the 23rd Infantry Division from 12 June 1968 to 1 May 1969.

In June 1972, Cooksey took over MG Frederick Kroesen's role as senior U.S. military adviser in I Corps and assumed responsibility for supporting the South Vietnamese forces in undoing the North Vietnamese gains in the Easter Offensive.

Post Vietnam
He served as deputy chief of staff for research, development and acquisition until his retirement from the Army in 1978.

Later life
After his retirement he established a military consulting firm in Alexandria, Virginia. He worked as a consultant for Ford Aerospace when they were competing for the award of the Division Air Defense gun system. The contract was awarded to Ford on 7 May 1981. It was later suggested that Ford had acted improperly in engaging consultants such as Cooksey who had only recently retired from key equipment decision-making roles in the Army and an investigation was launched by Undersecretary of the Army, James R. Ambrose, a former Ford Aerospace executive.

He died of heart disease on 22 December 1999 at Fort Belvoir and was buried at Arlington National Cemetery.

References

1921 births
1999 deaths
United States Army generals
Recipients of the Silver Star
People from Brentsville, Virginia
People from Manassas, Virginia
United States Army personnel of World War II